Neil Vernon-Roberts (born 20 June 1933) is a Kenyan former sports shooter. He competed at the 1964 Summer Olympics in the men's 50 metre rifle prone event.

References

1933 births
Living people
Kenyan male sport shooters
Olympic shooters of Kenya
Shooters at the 1964 Summer Olympics
Place of birth missing (living people)